Isorrhoa ancistrota is a moth in the family Cosmopterigidae. It was described by Turner in 1923. It is found in Australia, where it has been recorded from Queensland.

References

Natural History Museum Lepidoptera generic names catalog

Cosmopteriginae
Moths described in 1923